Juan Antonio Ros Martínez (born 15 March 1996) is a Spanish footballer who plays for Albacete Balompié. Mainly a defensive midfielder, he can also play as a central defender.

Club career
Born in Cartagena but raised in Los Nietos, both in the Region of Murcia, Ros joined FC Barcelona's La Masia in 2013, after representing FC Cartagena, EF Torre Pacheco, FC Cartagena-La Unión and CF Los Belones. After finishing his graduation, he was promoted to the reserves in July 2015, after the club's relegation to Segunda División B.

Ros made his senior debut on 22 August 2015, starting in a 1–2 away loss against UE Cornellà. He scored his first senior goal the following 27 March, netting the opener in a 2–0 win at CD Llosetense.

On 14 July 2016, Ros moved to another reserve team, Celta de Vigo B also in the third division. The following 19 January, after being sparingly used, he moved to fellow league team FC Cartagena on loan for the remainder of the season.

Upon returning, Ros was a regular starter for Celta B until signing for Villarreal CF B on 5 August 2020. On 25 June of the following year, he agreed to a two-year contract with Segunda División side CD Lugo.

Ros made his professional debut on 15 August 2021, starting in a 2–2 away draw against Real Oviedo. He scored his first professional goal on 6 November, in a 2–1 home loss against SD Ponferradina.

On 25 July 2022, Ros signed a three-year deal with Albacete Balompié also in the second division.

References

External links

1996 births
Living people
Sportspeople from Cartagena, Spain
Spanish footballers
Footballers from the Region of Murcia
Association football defenders
Segunda División players
Segunda División B players
FC Barcelona Atlètic players
Celta de Vigo B players
FC Cartagena footballers
Villarreal CF B players
CD Lugo players
Albacete Balompié players
Spain youth international footballers